Bunseo of Baekje (died 304, r. 298–304) was the tenth king of Baekje, one of the Three Kingdoms of Korea.

Background
He was the eldest son of King Chaekgye. He became king upon Chaekgye's death in 298 when he was killed in battle during the 13th year of his reign. The Samguk Sagi records that "from his youth he was bright and intelligent, and in his performance of rites he was bold and upright. His father the king loved him, and never separated him from his side".

Reign
He continued to wage war against the Chinese Lelang commandery whose forces had killed his father. In 304, he captured a western district of the Lelang commandery.  According to the Samguk Sagi, the governor of the commandery thereupon sent an assassin who killed him.

Samguk Sagi:
 298 AD, winter, tenth month. There was a great amnesty.
 299 AD, spring, first month. The king visited Dongmyeong shrine.
 302 AD, summer, fourth month. A comet was seen during the day.
 304 AD, spring, second month. The king secretly led an army to go and take the western territory of Lelang commandery. Winter, tenth month. The king was killed by an assassin sent by the master of Lelang commandery.

Legacy
With the death of Bunseo, a descendant of the 8th king Goi, the rival royal line descended from the 5th king Chogo, retook the throne, except for the brief rule of Bunseo's son Gye as the 12th king.

Family
 Father: Chaekgye of Baekje
 Mother: Lady Bogwa (보과부인, 寶菓夫人) - daughter of the governor of Daifang commandery.
 Queen(s): unknown
 Son: Buyeo Gye (扶餘契, ?–346) - eldest son, 12th King of Baekje, Gye of Baekje.

See also
List of monarchs of Korea
History of Korea

References
  Content in this article was copied from Samguk Sagi Scroll 23  at the Shoki Wiki, which is licensed under the Creative Commons Attribution-Share Alike 3.0 (Unported) (CC-BY-SA 3.0) license.

304 deaths
Baekje rulers
Assassinated Korean people
People murdered in Korea
4th-century monarchs in Asia
3rd-century monarchs in Asia
Year of birth unknown
4th-century Korean people
3rd-century Korean people